Christophe Casa (born 30 May 1957) is a former professional tennis player from France.

Career
Casa won the 16 and under Orange Bowl title in 1973 and was the 1974 French Open boys' singles champion, defeating West German Ulrich Marten in the final.

In 1977, Casa made the quarter-finals of the Nice International Championships. He also made the second round of the French Open men's draw that year (beating Bob Carmichael).

Casa made the second round of the 1980 French Open as well, defeating countryman Jean-Louis Haillet, before losing in the second round to Van Winitsky, in five sets.

He reached the quarter-finals at Nice again in 1983, with wins over Guy Forget and top 20 player Jimmy Arias.

Challenger titles

Singles: (2)

References

1957 births
Living people
French male tennis players
Sportspeople from Nice
French Open junior champions
Grand Slam (tennis) champions in boys' singles